Kostelec u Křížků is a municipality and village in Prague-East District in the Central Bohemian Region of the Czech Republic. It has about 700 inhabitants.

History
The settlement was founded here in 922. In 992, the construction of the Romanesque rotunda of the Church of Saint Martin began, and finished in 1151.

Gallery

References

External links

Villages in Prague-East District